Ivaylo P. Simidchiev (born February 13, 1970) is a film director, writer and producer from Bulgaria. His short film Mud won 8 international awards and was a competition selection at the 1998 Cannes Film Festival edition.

Filmography

 Semi-Nuclear (2014) – Director, Screenwriter, Producer. About people left after the Soviet Nuclear Testing Program at former Semipalatinsk (Kazakhstan) Test Site 
 The Last Journey (2010) – Director, Screenwriter, Editor, Producer Documentary. A older women travels to say goodbyes to her relatives.
 Fury (2009) – Screenwriter, Director, Producer
 The Unseen (2005) – Production: Bulgarian National Television, Bulgaria Director 27 min. Documentary. A professional night club bouncer founds a martial arts club among blind schoolchildren.
 On Suicide (2005) – Director, Screenwriter, Editor, Producer An analysis of suicide’s increasing death rates worldwide.
 CINEMETT or… the Time's Coming for the Cat and the Dog to Get Together (2004) – Director, Screenwriter, Editor. Follows six young heroin-dependent people over two years.
 3:33 A.M. (2002) – Director, Screenwriter, Editor, Producer; adaptation of the play "My Legs at Night, My Breast at Noon", by Ivaylo Simidchiev.
 The war between sexes has no day off...
 Lemon is Lemon (2001) – Director, Screenwriter, Editor Documentary, received four US awards. Five guys gather in an abandoned building, cook up and shoot up dope. Later they chat.
 Mud (1997) – Production: Director, Screenwriter, Producer fiction film. A foreign visitor finds himself accidentally involved in a chase for a stray child. The latter seriously injures him, but will also try in his own way to save him.

Theatre 
"Macbeth" by William Shakespeare 2008; Production: "Help for children at risk" association, Bulgaria Director, Multimedia artist Part of the "School-Theatre-Life" project funded by Cooperating Netherlands Foundations for Central and Eastern Europe (CNF).
"A Midsummer night’s dream" by William Shakespeare 2000-2001; Production: Technosid BG Ltd., Bulgaria Director, Producer An acting school project, aimed at preserving and creating the proper evolution conditions for young and promising acting talent.
"My Legs at Night, my Breasts – at Noon" by Ivaylo Simidchiev, 1999-2000; Production: Technosid BG Ltd., Bulgaria Playwright, Director, Art Director, Producer; State Theatre of Satire in Sofia.

Awards
For "Mud" (1997):
 "A Certain Regard" Award for Cinematography, Popovo, Bulgaria, 1998
 "Most Surprising Film" Award, 13th International Odense Film festival, Denmark, 1998
 "Kodak's Best Film" Award, Sofia International Student Film Festival, Bulgaria, 1998
 "Special Mention of the Jury", 10th Festival Premiers Plans, Angers, France, 1998
 "Best Director" Award, International Munich Festival of Film Schools, Germany, 1997
 "VFF Young Talent Award", International Munich Festival of Film Schools, Germany, 1997
 "Best Balkan Short Film" Award, International Short Film Festival of Drama, Greece, 1997
 "All Russian State Cinematography Institute Honorable Diploma" Varna International Film Festival, Bulgaria, 1997

For "Lemon is Lemon" (2001):
 "The Face of Drugs" Award, Palm Springs International Festival of Short Films in 2001
 "Best Short Documentary" Award, Cinequest Film Festival, 2002
 "Honorable Mention", Ann Arbor International Film Festival 2002
 "Director's Citation" Award, 23rd Black Maria Film & Video Festival (New Jersey) 2003

References

External links

1970 births
Bulgarian film directors
Living people